This is a list of notable Afghan singers that have entered the industry, currently working or have left the industry.



A
Ahmad Wali
Ahmad Zahir
Aryana Sayeed
Abdul Rahim Sarban
Amir Jan Sabori
Awalmir
Asad Badie
Aziz Herawi

B
Bakht Zamina
Beltoon
Burka Band

D
Dawood Sarkhosh

E
Ehsan Aman
Elaha Soroor

F
Farhad Darya
Farid Rastagar
Faiz Karizi
Farid Zaland

H
Hangama
Haidar Salim

I
Jalil Zaland

K
Khyal Muhammad

L
Latif Nangarhari

M
Mohammad Din Zakhil
Mozhdah Jamalzadah
Mohammad Hussain Sarahang
Mahwash
Mohammad Hashem Cheshti
Miri Maftun
Mangal
Mohammad Din Zakhil

N
Nasrat Parsa
Naghma
Nashenas
Naim Popal
Nainawaz

P
Parasto

Q
Qamar Gula    
Qader Eshpari

R
Rafiq Shinwari
Rahim Mehryar
Rahim Bakhsh
Rezwan Munawar
Rishad Zahir
Rukhshana

S
Sardar Ali Takkar
Shah Wali
Soosan Firooz
Shakeeb Hamdard
Seeta Qasemi
Soheila Zaland
Saifo
Seema Tarana

T
Tawab Arash

U
Ubaidullah Jan

V
Vahid Soroor

W
Wajiha Rastagar
Wahed Wafa

Z
Zahir Howaida

Singers

Afghan